Thomas Thebaud (of Sudbury) was the Dean of Wells between 1381 and 1389.

References

Deans of Wells